Gastroenterology (from the Greek gastḗr- “belly”, -énteron “intestine”, and -logía "study of") is the branch of medicine focused on the digestive system and its disorders. The digestive system consists of the gastrointestinal tract, sometimes referred to as the GI tract, which includes the esophagus, stomach, small intestine and large intestine as well as the accessory organs of digestion which includes the pancreas, gallbladder, and liver. The digestive system functions to move material through the GI tract via peristalsis, break down that material via digestion, absorb nutrients for use throughout the body, and remove waste from the body via defecation. Physicians who specialize in the medical specialty of gastroenterology are called gastroenterologists or sometimes GI doctors. Some of the most common conditions managed by gastroenterologists include gastroesophageal reflux disease, gastrointestinal bleeding, irritable bowel syndrome, irritable bowel disease which includes Crohn's disease and ulcerative colitis, peptic ulcer disease, gallbladder and biliary tract disease, hepatitis, pancreatitis, colitis, colon polyps and cancer, nutritional problems, and many more.

History 

Citing from Egyptian papyri, John F. Nunn identified significant knowledge of gastrointestinal diseases among practicing physicians during the periods of the pharaohs. Irynakhty, of the tenth dynasty,  2125 B.C., was a court physician specializing in gastroenterology, sleeping, and proctology.

Among ancient Greeks, Hippocrates attributed digestion to concoction. Galen's concept of the stomach having four faculties was widely accepted up to modernity in the seventeenth century.

Eighteenth-century 
 Italian Lazzaro Spallanzani (1729–99) was among early physicians to disregard Galen's theories, and in 1780 he gave experimental proof on the action of gastric juice on foodstuffs.
 In 1767, German Johann von Zimmermann wrote an important work on dysentery.
 In 1777, Maximilian Stoll of Vienna described cancer of the gallbladder.

Nineteenth-century 
 In 1805, Philipp Bozzini made the first attempt to observe inside the living human body using a tube he named Lichtleiter (light-guiding instrument) to examine the urinary tract, the rectum, and the pharynx. This is the earliest description of endoscopy.
 Charles Emile Troisier described enlargement of lymph nodes in abdominal cancer.
 In 1823, William Prout discovered that stomach juices contain hydrochloric acid.
 In 1833, William Beaumont published Experiments and Observations on the Gastric Juice and the Physiology of Digestion following years of experimenting on test subject Alexis St. Martin.
 In 1868, Adolf Kussmaul, a well-known German physician, developed the gastroscope. He perfected the technique on a sword swallower.
 In 1871, at the society of physicians in Vienna, Carl Stoerk demonstrated an esophagoscope made of two telescopic metal tubes, initially devised by Waldenburg in 1870.
 In 1876, Karl Wilhelm von Kupffer described the properties of some liver cells now called Kupffer cells.
 In 1883, Hugo Kronecker and Samuel James Meltzer studied oesophageal manometry in humans.

Twentieth-century 
 In 1915, Jesse McClendon tested acidity of human stomach in situ.
 In 1921–22, Walter Alvarez did the first electrogastrography research.
 Rudolf Schindler described many important diseases involving the human digestive system during World War I in his illustrated textbook and is portrayed by some as the "father of gastroscopy". He and Georg Wolf developed a semiflexible gastroscope in 1932.
 In 1932, Burrill Bernard Crohn described Crohn's disease.
 In 1957, Basil Hirschowitz introduced the first prototype of a fibreoptic gastroscope.

Twenty-first century 
 In 2005, Barry Marshall and Robin Warren of Australia were awarded the Nobel Prize in Physiology or Medicine for their discovery of Helicobacter pylori (1982/1983) and its role in peptic ulcer disease. James Leavitt assisted in their research, but the Nobel Prize is not awarded posthumously so he was not included in the award.

Disease classification 
1. International Classification of Disease (ICD 2007)/WHO classification:
 Chapter XI, Diseases of the digestive system,(K00-K93)
2. MeSH subject Heading:
 Gastroenterology (G02.403.776.409.405)
 Gastroenterological diseases(C06.405)
3. National Library of Medicine Catalogue (NLM classification 2006):
 Digestive system(W1)

Procedures

Colonoscopy 

A procedure using a long thin tube with a camera that is passed through the anus to visualize the rectum and the entire length of the colon. The procedure is performed either to look for colon polyps and/or colon cancer in somebody without symptoms, referred to as screening, or to further evaluate symptoms including rectal bleeding, dark tarry stools, change in bowel habits or stool consistency (diarrhea, pencil-thin stool), abdominal pain, and unexplained weight loss. Before the procedure the physician might ask the patient to stop taking certain medications including blood thinners, aspirin, diabetes medications, or Nonsteroidal anti-inflammatory drugs. A bowel prep is usually taken the night before and into the morning of the procedure which consists of an enema or laxatives, either pills or powder dissolved in liquid, that will cause diarrhea. The procedure might need to be stopped and rescheduled if there is stool remaining in the colon due to an incomplete bowel prep because the physician can not adequately visualize the colon. During the procedure the patient is sedated and the scope is used to examine the entire length of the colon looking for polyps, bleeding, or abnormal tissue. A biopsy or polyp removal can then be performed and the tissue sent to the lab for evaluation. The procedure usually takes thirty minutes to an hour followed by a one to two hour observation period. Complications include bloating, cramping, a reaction to anesthesia, bleeding, and a hole through the wall of the colon that may require repeat colonoscopy or surgery. Signs of a serious complication requiring urgent or emergent medical attention include severe pain in the abdomen, fever, bleeding that does not improve, dizziness, and weakness.

Sigmoidoscopy 

A procedure similar to a colonoscopy using a long thin tube with a camera (scope) passed through the anus but only intended to visualize the rectum and the last part of the colon closest to the rectum. All aspects of the procedure are the same as for a colonoscopy with the exception that this procedure only lasts ten to twenty minutes and is done without sedation. This usually allows for the patient to return to normal activities immediately after the procedure is finished.

Esophagogastroduodenoscopy (EGD) 
A procedure using a long thin tube with a camera that is passed through the mouth to view the esophagus ("esophago-"), stomach ("gastro-"), and the duodenum ("duodeno-"). It is also referred to as upper endoscopy or just endoscopy. The procedure is performed for further evaluation of symptoms including persistent heartburn, indigestion, vomiting blood, dark tarry stools, persistent nausea and vomiting, pain, difficulty swallowing, painful swallowing, and unexplained weight loss. It is also performed for further testing following a lab test that shows low hemoglobin levels without a known cause or an abnormal barium swallow. The procedure can be used to diagnose many disorders through direct visualization or tissue biopsy including esophageal varices, esophageal strictures, gastroesophageal reflux disease, Barrett's esophagus, cancer, celiac disease, gastritis, peptic ulcer disease, and a H. pylori infection. Intra-operative techniques can then be used for treatment of certain disorders like banding esophageal varices or dilating esophageal strictures. The patient will likely be required to not eat or drink anything starting 4 hours prior to the procedure. Sedation is usually required for patient comfort. This procedure usually lasts around thirty minutes followed by a one to two hour observation period. Side effects include bloating, nausea, and a sore throat for 1 to 2 days. Complications are rare but include reaction to the anesthesia, bleeding, and a hole through the wall of the esophagus, stomach, or small intestine which could require surgery. Signs of a serious complication requiring urgent or emergent medical attention include chest pain, problems breathing, problems swallowing, throat pain that gets worse, vomiting with blood or the appearance of "coffee-grounds", worsening abdominal pain, bloody or black tarry stool, and fever.

Endoscopic Retrograde Cholangiopancreatography (ERCP) 

A procedure using a long thin tube with a camera passed through your mouth into the first part of your small intestine to locate, diagnose, and treat disorders related to your bile and pancreatic ducts. These ducts carry fluids that help with digesting food from your liver, gallbladder, and pancreas and can become narrowed or blocked as a result of gallstones, infection, inflammation, pancreatic pseudocysts, and tumors of the bile ducts or pancreas. As a result one may experience back pain, yellowing of the skin, and an abnormal lab test showing an elevated bilirubin level which could necessitate this procedure. However, the procedure is not recommended if the patient has acute pancreatitis unless the level of bilirubin remains high or is increasing which could suggest the blockage is still present. The patient will likely be required to not eat or drink anything starting 8 hours prior to the procedure. After the patient is sedated, the physician will pass the scope through the mouth, esophagus, stomach, and into the duodenum to locate the opening where the ducts drain into the small intestine. The physician can then inject dye into these ducts and take X-rays which show a real time view, via fluoroscopy, allowing the physician to locate and relieve the blockage. This is done through multiple techniques including cutting the opening and creating a bigger hole for drainage, removing gallstones and other debris, dilating narrow parts of the ducts, or placing a stent which keeps the ducts open. The physician can also take a biopsy of the ducts to evaluate for cancer, infection, or inflammation. Side effects include bloating, nausea, or a sore throat for 1 to 2 days. Complications include pancreatitis, infection of the bile ducts or gallbladder, bleeding, reaction to the anesthesia, and perforation of any structures that the scope or its instruments pass but particularly the duodenum, bile duct, and pancreatic duct. Signs of a serious complication requiring urgent or emergent medical attention include bloody or black tarry stool, chest pain, fever, worsening abdominal pain, worsening throat pain, problems breathing, problems swallowing, vomit that is bloody or looks like coffee-grounds. Most of the time complications from this procedure require hospitalization for treatment.

Disorders

Esophagus

Gastroesophageal reflux disease (GERD) 
A condition that is a result of stomach contents consistently coming back up into the esophagus causing troublesome symptoms or complications. Symptoms are considered troublesome based on how disruptive they are to a patient's daily life and well-being. This definition was standardized by the Montreal Consensus in 2006. Symptoms include a painful feeling in the middle of the chest and feeling stomach contents coming back up into the mouth. Other symptoms include chest pain, nausea, difficulty swallowing, painful swallowing, coughing, and hoarseness. Risk factors include obesity, pregnancy, smoking, hiatal hernia, certain medications, and certain foods. Diagnosis is usually based on symptoms and medical history, with further testing only after treatment has been ineffective. Further diagnosis can be achieved by measuring how much acid enters the esophagus or looking into your esophagus with a scope. Treatment and management options include lifestyle modifications, medications, and surgery if there is no improvement with other interventions. Lifestyle modifications include not lying down for three hours after eating, lying down on the left side, elevating head while laying by elevating head of the bed or using extra pillows, losing weight, stopping smoking, and avoiding coffee, mint, alcohol, chocolate, fatty foods, acidic foods, and spicy foods. Medications include antacids, proton pump inhibitors, H2 receptor blockers. Surgery is usually a Nissen fundoplication and is performed by a surgeon. Complications of longstanding GERD can include inflammation of the esophagus that may cause bleeding or ulcer formation, narrowing of the esophagus leading to swallowing issues, a change in the lining of the esophagus that can increase the chances of developing cancer (Barrett's esophagus), chronic cough, asthma, inflammation of the larynx leading to hoarseness, and wearing away of tooth enamel leading to dental issues.

Barrett's esophagus 

A condition in which the lining of the esophagus changes to look more like the lining of the intestine and increases the risk of developing esophageal cancer. There are no specific symptoms although symptoms of GERD may be present for years prior as it is associated with a 10–15% risk of Barrett's esophagus. Risk factors include chronic GERD for more than 5 years, being age 50 or older, being non-Hispanic white, being male, having a family history of this disorder, belly fat, and a history of smoking. Protective factors include H. pylori infection, frequent use of aspirin or other non-steroidal anti-inflammatory drugs, and diets high in fruits and vegetables. Diagnosis can be made by looking into the esophagus with a scope and possibly taking a biopsy of the lining of the esophagus. Treatment includes managing GERD, destroying abnormal parts of the esophagus, removing abnormal tissue in the esophagus, and removing part of the esophagus as performed by a general surgeon. Further management could include periodic surveillance with repeat scopes at certain intervals determined by the physician, likely not more frequently than every three to five years. Complications from this disorder can result in a type of cancer called esophageal adenocarcinoma.

Education and training

United States 
Gastroenterology is a subspecialty of internal medicine and therefore requires three years of internal medicine residency training followed by three additional years in a dedicated gastroenterology fellowship. This training is certified by the American Board of Internal Medicine (ABIM) and the American Osteopathic Board of Internal Medicine (AOBIM) and must be completed at a program accredited by the Accreditation Council for Graduate Medical Education (ACGME). Other national societies that oversee training include the American College of Gastroenterology (ACG), the American Gastroenterological Association (AGA), and the American Society for Gastrointestinal Endoscopy (ASGE).

Scope of practice 
Gastroenterologists see patients both in the clinic and the hospital setting. They can order diagnostic tests, prescribe medications, and perform a number of diagnostic and therapeutic procedures including colonoscopy, esophagogastroduodenoscopy (EGD), endoscopic retrograde cholangiopancreatography (ERCP), endoscopic ultrasound (EUS), and liver biopsy.

Subspecialties 
Some gastroenterology trainees will complete a "fourth-year" (although this is often their seventh year of graduate medical education) in transplant hepatology, advanced interventional endoscopy, inflammatory bowel disease, motility, or other topics.

Advanced endoscopy, sometimes called interventional or surgical endoscopy, is a sub-specialty of gastroenterology that focuses on advanced endoscopic techniques for the treatment of pancreatic, hepatobiliary, and gastrointestinal disease. Interventional gastroenterologists typically undergo an additional year of rigorous training in advanced endoscopic techniques including endoscopic retrograde cholangiopancreatography, endoscopic ultrasound-guided diagnostic and interventional procedures, and advanced resection techniques including endoscopic mucosal resection and endoscopic submucosal dissection. Additionally, the performance of endoscopic bariatric procedures is also performed by some advanced endoscopists.

Hepatology, or hepatobiliary medicine, encompasses the study of the liver, pancreas, and biliary tree, and is traditionally considered a sub-specialty of gastroenterology, while proctology encompasses disorders of the anus, rectum, and colon and is considered a sub-specialty of general surgery.

Professional organizations 
 American College of Gastroenterology (ACG) - was founded in 1932 by a group of 10 gastroenterologists in New York City and now consists of over 16,000 gastroenterologists from 86 countries. Their mission statement reads "Our mission is to enhance the ability of our members to provide world class care to patients with digestive disorders and advance the profession through excellence and innovation based upon the pillars of Patient Care, Education, Scientific Investigation, Advocacy and Practice Management."  The ACG sponsors conferences regionally and nationally, publishes several journals including The American Journal of Gastroenterology, Clinical and Translational Gastroenterology, and ACG Case Reports Journal, hosts continuing medical education (CME) programs, supports initiatives for fellows-in-training, develops and promotes evidence-based guidelines, supports advocacy and public policy, and provides clinical research funding consisting of $27 million in research grants and career development awards ($2.2 million in 2022).
 American Gastroenterological Association (AGA) - was founded in 1897 and now includes over 16,000 members worldwide. Their mission statement reads "Empowering clinicians and researchers to improve digestive health." The AGA publishes two journals monthly titled Gastroenterology and Clinical Gastroenterology and Hepatology, sponsors an annual meeting called Digestive Disease Week (DDW), provides more than $3 million each year in research grants to over 50 investigators through the AGA Research Foundation Awards Program ($2.56 million to 61 investigators in 2022), develops and promotes evidence-based guidelines, influences public policy through AGA’s Congressional Advocates Program and the AGA political action committee (PAC), and supports a variety of educational opportunities including those that qualify for continuing medical education (CME) and maintenance of certification (MOC) credits.
 American Society for Gastrointestinal Endoscopy (ASGE) - was founded in 1941 and now includes around 15,000 members worldwide. Their mission statement reads "The American Society for Gastrointestinal Endoscopy is the global leader in advancing digestive care through education, advocacy and promotion of excellence and innovation in endoscopy." The ASGE publishes a monthly journal titled Gastrointestinal Endoscopy (GIE), develops and promotes evidence-based guidelines, offers educational resources for its members, and provides advocacy resources for influencing public policy.
 World Gastroenterology Organisation (WGO) - was founded in 1958 and consists of 119 Member Societies and 4 regional affiliated associations from around the world which represents a combined 60,000 individuals. The WGO mission statement reads "To promote, to the general public and healthcare professional alike, an awareness of the worldwide prevalence and optimal care of gastrointestinal and liver disorders, and to improve care of these disorders, through the provision of high quality, accessible and independent education and training." The WGO publishes a newsletter titled the electronic World Gastroenterology News (e-WGN), develops global guidelines, engages in advocacy through World Digestive Health Day (WDHD) held yearly on 29 May, and provides educational resources including 23 training centers around the world and a Train the Trainers (TTT) program.
 British Society of Gastroenterology
 United European Gastroenterology

Academic journals 
 The American Journal of Gastroenterology
 Clinical Gastroenterology and Hepatology
 Endoscopy
 Gastroenterology
 Gastrointestinal Endoscopy
 Gut
 Inflammatory Bowel Diseases
 Journal of Clinical Gastroenterology
 Journal of Crohn's and Colitis
 Neurogastroenterology & Motility
 World Journal of Gastroenterology

References